Andi Arndt is an American audiobook narrator. She is in the Audible Narrator Hall of Fame and has won two Audie Awards and three Voice Arts Awards.

Biography 
Arndt is a classically-trained actress and has studied Spanish, Dutch, Italian, French, and Mandarin Chinese.  She began her career hosting public radio programs, as well as teaching acting and voice/speech at James Madison University. In 2014, Arndt founded Lyric Audiobooks, an audiobook production company.

She lives in Virginia's Shenandoah Valley with her husband and their two daughters.

Awards and honors 
In 2015, AudioFile included Arndt's narration of Broken Juliet in their list of the best romantic fiction narrations of the year.

In 2018, she was inducted into Audible's Narrator Hall of Fame.

References

External links 

 Official website
 AudioFile page
 Lyric Audiobooks

People from the Shenandoah Valley
People from Virginia
21st-century American actresses
Year of birth missing (living people)
Living people
Audiobook narrators